Pretiliini is a tribe of longhorn beetles of the subfamily Lamiinae. It contains a single genus, Pretilia, and a single species, Pretilia tuberculata.

References

Lamiinae